Joseph Buford (born June 19, 1967) is an American former professional stock car racing driver.

Racing career

Buford began his career at Duck River Speedway in 1989. He took his father's advice (two-time Nashville Speedway USA champ James "Flookie" Buford) and started racing at Nashville in 1991. He was an instant success, winning three races and the "Rookie of the Year" honors. He moved to the premier late model division in 1992. Buford was a four-time track champion at the historic track (1998, 1999, 2000, 2002), tying Coo Coo Marlin for the most titles in track history. His 66 victories passed the long-standing Darrell Waltrip record of 55 career victories at the track. He was the 1998 Heartland Region Champion (missing the national title by only a 1/2 point). He finished second in the Heartland Region in 1999 and 2000.

Buford won two NASCAR Southern Division races. He finished third in his first NASCAR Goody's Dash Series race. He also raced in the All-Pro Series. Buford started three Craftsman Truck Series and 18 Busch Series races with little success.

The total amount of races that he entered were 39. During his career he had a race win percentage of 17.9%. He won 7 races in total. His strongest
year (career wise) was 2000. He entered 18 races and won 7 in 2000.

Motorsports career results

NASCAR
(key) (Bold – Pole position awarded by qualifying time. Italics – Pole position earned by points standings or practice time. * – Most laps led.)

Busch Series

Craftsman Truck Series

ARCA Bondo/Mar-Hyde Series
(key) (Bold – Pole position awarded by qualifying time. Italics – Pole position earned by points standings or practice time. * – Most laps led.)

References

External links
 
 

1967 births
NASCAR drivers
Living people
People from Franklin, Tennessee
Racing drivers from Tennessee
ARCA Menards Series drivers